Mexico competed at the 2002 Winter Olympics in Salt Lake City, United States.

Bobsleigh

Skeleton

References

Official Olympic Reports

Nations at the 2002 Winter Olympics
2002 Winter Olympics
Olympics, Winter